Garrison is an English surname and given name derived from "son  of Gerard", and the surname was brought from the Patronymic name Gerhardsen during the Viking Invasion. The name is not related to the word "garrison". Notable people with the name include:

Surname
Ben Garrison (born 1957), American right-wing political cartoonist
Carol Garrison (born 1952), President of the University of Alabama at Birmingham from 2002 to 2012
Christian Garrison (1942–2020), American crime writer
C. K. Garrison, entrepreneur and Mayor of San Francisco (1853–54)
Don Garrison (1925–2018), American lawyer and politician
Eve Garrison, (1903–2003), American artist 
Fielding Hudson Garrison (1870–1935), American scholar of the history of medicine
Ford Garrison (1915–2001), Major League Baseball outfielder
Gary Garrison (born 1944), American professional football player
Harriet E. Garrison (1848–1930), American physician, writer 
Jason Garrison (born 1984), Canadian professional ice hockey player
Jennifer Garrison (born 1962), American politician from Ohio
Jim Garrison (1921–1992), Louisiana district attorney, investigator of John F. Kennedy assassination
Jimmy Garrison (1933–1976), American jazz double bassist
Matthew Garrison (born 1970), American jazz electric bassist
Lane Garrison (born 1980), American actor
Len Garrison (1943–2003), Black British educationalist and historian
Lindley Miller Garrison (1864–1932), US Secretary of War under President Woodrow Wilson
Orestes Garrison (1813–1874), American politician
Roger Garrison (born 1944), American economist
Sean Garrison (1937–2018), American actor
Sidney Clarence Garrison (1885–1945), American educator and psychologist.
T. Ed Garrison, Jr. (1922–2013), American farmer and politician
Walt Garrison (born 1944), former National Football League player
Wendell Phillips Garrison (1840–1907), American editor and author.
William Lloyd Garrison (1805–1879), American abolitionist leader
William F. Garrison, United States Army major general
William Garrison (geographer) (1924–2015), American civil engineer and geographer
Zina Garrison (born 1963), former professional tennis player

Given name
Garrison Brooks (born 1999), American basketball player
Garrison Hearst (born 1971), American football running back
Garrison Keillor (born 1942), American author and radio host of A Prairie Home Companion
Garrison Sanborn (born 1985), American football long snapper

Fictional characters
C.J. Garrison, on the soap opera The Bold and the Beautiful
Clarke Garrison, on The Bold and the Beautiful
Herbert Garrison, aka Mr./Mrs. Garrison, teacher from the television program South Park
Garrison Kane, in the Marvel Comics universe

References